Stanley River may refer to:

 Stanley River (Canterbury), New Zealand
 Stanley River (Queensland), Australia
 Stanley River (Tasman), New Zealand